This article is a list of historic places in Gloucester County, New Brunswick entered on the Canadian Register of Historic Places, whether they are federal, provincial, or municipal.

List of historic places

See also

 List of historic places in New Brunswick
 List of National Historic Sites of Canada in New Brunswick

Gloucester County, New Brunswick
Historic